Skywhale was a Progressive Rock band formed in Bristol UK in 1974 by musicians from Huddersfield. Skywhale members were Steve Robshaw on guitar, violin and synthesizer, Stan Thewlis on Flute and Tenor Sax, Howard Scarr also known as Gywo Zepix on keyboards, EMS VCS 3 and ARP Instruments synthesizers, the late Paul Todd on Soprano Sax, Flute and Penny Whistle, Dougall Airmole on Bass, Mick Avery on Drums and John Schofield on Percussion. Skywhale played at Glastonbury Festival in 1977. They recorded one L.P. of original compositions, The World at Mind's End in Bristol. The L.P. was re-released as a CD in 2006 on CD Baby.

Band History

Steve Robshaw moved to Bristol from Huddersfield in 1974 and gradually gathered a collection of fellow musicians who wanted to experiment with instrumental rock music  similar to what some of their peers were doing in the Canterbury Scene 100 miles away on the other side of England. The band consisted of Robshaw on guitar, Paul Todd on saxophone, Pete (Lazlo) Ridsdale on violin, Jon Beedell on piano and Roy Dodds on drums. The band practiced in the cellar of Beedell's parents' house at the end house in Windsor Terrace, Clifton, overlooking the Avon Gorge and underneath the Clifton Suspension Bridge. They were joined in 1975 by tenor sax and flute player Stan Thewlis, also from Huddersfield. In 1977 synthesizer and keyboard player Howard Scarr, also known as Gwyo Zepix left the band Zorch to join Skywhale and they played at Glastonbury. Dodds was replaced by Mick Avery on drums and the band procured recording time at Mushroom Studios Clifton   where Avery acted as sound engineer. They also made a short 12 date tour of Holland. Sadly Soprano sax player Paul Todd was killed in a car accident shortly after the completion of their first and only L.P. The World At Mind's End.

Skywhale played at the Ashton Court Festival in 1978 and at South West venues until 1979 when they disbanded. Steve Robshaw went on to work with Peter Hammill as a composer on three of his albums, PH7, Skeletons Of Songs, and Typical, Howard Scarr joined Gong (band), reformed Zorch in 2000, and in 2008 was hired by composer Hans Zimmer, while Roy Dodds went on to play with The Korgis, Annie Whitehead, k.d. lang, Maddy Prior, Steve Tilston and Eddi Reader. Stan Thewlis  played with the Bristol jazz group Spirit Level, then in the mid 1980s he changed his name to Stan Rivera, joining Colombian percussionist Roberto Pla in London to form  El Sonido de Londres, one of the UK's first Salsa music bands, and then London Merengue music dance band Merengada.

References

British progressive rock groups